Gastroclonium reflexum is a small red marine seaweed.

Description
Gastroclonium ovatum is a small alga which grows to 15 cm long. The branches are cylindrical, grow from a branched holdfast and branch irregularly. It shows short branches which are hollow with bladder-like or vesicle-like branches - rather elongate with a single joint. In colour it is dark purplish red.

Habitat
Found in rock pools in the littoral or upper sublittoral, epilithic or epiphytic.

Distribution
Recorded from the British Isles, Mauritania, Canary Islands and the Channel Islands.

Reproduction
The sexes are separate. The female cystocarps occur on the branches and the tetrasporangia in the cortex of the vesicles.

Similar species
Gastroclonium reflexum distinguished by many branches being reflexed and Chylocladia verticillata.

References

Rhodymeniales